Pandukht Manukyan (25 May 1951 – 21 June 2021) was an Armenian politician.

Biography
Manukyan studied civil engineering at the National Polytechnic University of Armenia from 1968 to 1973. He then worked as a foreman and civil engineer from 1973 to 1994. A member of the Pan-Armenian National Movement (HHS), he was elected to the National Assembly in 1995, serving until 1999. He then became Governor of Vayots Dzor Province, serving from 1997 to 2003.

Pandukht Manukyan died in Yerevan on 21 June 2021 at the age of 70.

References

1951 births
2021 deaths
People from Vayots Dzor Province
Members of the National Assembly (Armenia)
Pan-Armenian National Movement politicians
National Polytechnic University of Armenia alumni